We Wish You a Merry Christmas is a 1962 album by Ray Conniff. The album was one of two platinum albums over the course of Conniff's career and earned him the title of CBS Records Best Selling Artist for 1962.

Track listing

References

Ray Conniff albums
1962 Christmas albums
Christmas albums by American artists
Columbia Records Christmas albums
Covers albums
Pop Christmas albums